The Private Patient (2008) is a crime novel by English author P. D. James, the fourteenth and last in her popular Adam Dalgliesh series.

Synopsis
In deepest Dorset, the once magnificent Cheverell Manor has been renovated and transformed into a plastic surgery clinic, run by the famous cosmetic practitioner George Chandler-Powell. Two days after Rhoda Gradwyn, an investigative journalist, arrives in the hope of having her almost lifelong facial scar removed, she's savagely murdered and Chandler-Powell finds his surgery under scrutiny from Dalgliesh and his team, who are soon caught in a race against time when another body shows up...

Characters 
Commander Adam Dalgliesh: head of the special investigation squad, sent to investigate the murder.
Inspector Kate Miskin: a member of Dalgliesh's team and second in command. She's awaiting promotion and has an unrequited love for Dalgliesh.
Sergeant Benton-Smith: often referred to as just Benton, of Indian descent. Clever and opinionated, another member of Dalgliesh's team.
Rhoda Gradwyn: an investigative journalist and the first murder victim. Comes to the manor to have an almost lifelong scar removed but is murdered just after the operation.
George Chandler-Powell: the owner of the manor and surgeon performing the operation on Gradwyn.
Robin Boyton: a failed actor and part time entrepreneur. A close friend of Gradwyn's, who is disturbed by the murder and is eventually killed. He is the cousin of the Westhalls and attempts to extort money from them.
Candace Westhall: cousin of Boyton and Marcus's sister. Works as one of the Manor's administrative staff and is revealed to have a grudge against Gradwyn, who exposed the plagiarism of an aspiring author who, upon being exposed committed suicide. Westhall was later revealed to be her mother who had given her up for adoption. Loves her brother dearly. Is suspected of committing fraud to ensure her family fortunes .
Marcus Westhall: Boyton's cousin and the brother of Candace. He's Chandler-Powell's assistant surgeon at the manor (and in London) and is preparing to go on a medical mission in Africa, something he does after the murder.
Sharon Bateman (Shirley Beale): domestic servant, revealed to be mentally unstable and on parole, from a mental institution, for the murder of her sister when they were children. She is obsessed with the burning of a witch which took place hundreds of years previously. Attempts to emotionally blackmail a, now head, teacher whom she met as a child into marriage.
Dean Bostock: chef at the manor, married to Kimberley, expectant father. At the end of the novel when the manor is converted to a restaurant he is given more influence but is still head chef. He and Kim agree to remain living on the premises once the murder is solved.
Kimberley Bostock: Dean's wife and expectant mother. She assists her husband and is the finder of Rhoda's body. She is a weak character who relies heavily on Dean.
Flavia Holland: a nurse who is in residence at the manor. At the start of the novel she and Chandler-Powell are in a relationship, which is terminated. After the case is solved she meets a man online, marries him, moves away and lives a family life.
Helena Cressett: administrator and heir of former owner. Marries Chandler-Powell.
Lettie Frensham: another administrator of the clinic. Formerly also employed by the Cressetts. 
Jeremy Coxon: an etiquette teacher and Boyton's friend and business partner.
DC Warren: a tall, bulky local detective assisting Dalgliesh's team on orders from the local force.
Emma Lavenham: Dalgliesh's fiancé, a lecturer at Cambridge University whom he marries in the closing pages of the novel.
Tom Mogworthy: the gardener and caretaker at the manor.
Clara Beckwith: Emma's lesbian friend, who's in love with her.
Annie: Clara's partner. She is assaulted and raped in the novel but little attention is paid to this part of the story. Annie wants Dalgliesh to take her case but he cannot, due to the Gradwyn/Boyton murders. Her assailant is caught and tried.
Mr Collinsby: a head teacher who is found to have been a lodger in Sharon Bateman's childhood home, she emotionally blackmails him in an attempt to make him marry her, this falls through when Dalgliesh and his team find out about the blackmail. Loved Lucy Beale.
Reverend Curtis: points Dalgliesh in Collinsby's direction after the Reverend's car is found near the Manor on the night of Rhoda's murder. Collinsby had borrowed the car to meet Sharon. His wife has minimal dialogue but has her attention concentrated on her young infant twins.
Dr Glenister: Dalgliesh's favoured pathologist, second to Kynaston, arrives to assess the body of Gradwyn before its removal. She conducts the autopsies of Gradwyn and Boyton.
DI A. Howard: investigates Annie's assault. Keeps Dalgliesh in the know as to how the case is going.

Reception
In a 2008 book review for The New York Times, Janet Maslin called the book an "exercise in impeccable detection", and wrote "James sets her mystery on comfortably familiar terrain and makes the most of its atmospherics. But the plotting of 'The Private Patient' is not up to this author’s diabolical best."  Kirkus Reviews summarized it as "Middling work for the peerless James, a whodunit as deeply shadowed by mortality as all Dalgliesh’s cases ever since 'Shroud for a Nightingale'" Donna Rifkind of The Washington Post wrote, "[It's] not the most formidable example of this iconic author's work, but it's still pretty darn good."

References

External links 
 Wall Street Journal
Interview with P. D. James for The Sunday Herald following publication of The Private Patient

Novels by P. D. James
2008 British novels
Novels set in Dorset
Faber and Faber books